Adam Michael Reed (born 8 May 1991), also known as Adam Tull, is a professional footballer who plays as a midfielder. Born in England, he represents the Philippines national team.

After starting his career with Sunderland, Reed had loan spells with Brentford, Bradford City, Leyton Orient, Portsmouth and York City. He signed for Burton Albion in 2013 and after being released had a second spell with York in 2014.

Club career
Reed was born in Hartlepool, County Durham and is of Filipino descent. He joined Sunderland's youth system at the age of eight, and became a reserve-team regular by 2009. On 21 February 2011, he joined League One club Brentford on a one-month loan deal. He made his first-team debut in his hometown, as on 5 March 2011 he replaced Robbie Simpson 58 minutes into a 3–0 away defeat to Hartlepool United. He made his first start three days later, in a 1–0 home defeat to Brighton & Hove Albion.

Reed signed a one-month loan with League Two club Bradford City on 29 September 2011. He returned to Sunderland at the end of October 2011, having made four appearances for Bradford with injuries also plaguing his stint at the club. On 8 March 2012, Reed joined League One club Leyton Orient on loan for the rest of the 2011–12 season.

On 24 January 2013, he signed on a one-month loan for Portsmouth in League One. On 7 March 2013, he returned to Sunderland after making 10 appearances for Portsmouth. He joined League Two club York City on 26 March 2013 on a one-month loan, making his debut four days later in a 0–0 draw away to Bristol Rovers. He scored his first goal to give York the lead with a 45th-minute goal against Accrington Stanley on 6 April 2013, a match that ended in a 1–1 draw. Reed finished his loan at York with two goals in six appearances.

At the end of 2012–13, Reed was released by Sunderland. On 18 June 2013, Reed signed for League Two club Burton Albion on a one-year contract. Reed rejoined York on 4 January 2014 on a contract until the end of 2013–14 after parting company with Burton. He was released by the club in May 2014.

After an unsuccessful trial with League One Crewe Alexandra Reed joined Northern Premier League Division One North club Darlington 1883 in August 2014. He signed for Northern League Division One club Whitley Bay on 1 November 2014.

In January 2016, Reed signed for United Football League club Stallion, before joining their divisional rivals Kaya in April.

Reed signed for Philippines Football League club Davao Aguilas in January 2018. After the 2018 season, Davao Aguilas folded and released all its players.

In February 2019, Reed signed for Thai League 1 club Chainat Hornbill.

Reed subsequently joined Malaysian Super League team Pahang in January 2020.

International career
In November 2017, Reed was included in the Philippines squad for the 2017 CTFA International Tournament that was held in Taiwan. He received his first cap on 1 December 2017 in a 3–1 win against Laos.

Career statistics

Club

International

International goals
As of match played 16 January 2019. Philippines score listed first, score column indicates score after each Reed goal.

References

External links

1991 births
Living people
Footballers from Hartlepool
People with acquired Filipino citizenship
British Asian footballers
English footballers
English expatriate footballers
Filipino footballers
Philippines international footballers
Association football midfielders
Sunderland A.F.C. players
Brentford F.C. players
Bradford City A.F.C. players
Leyton Orient F.C. players
Portsmouth F.C. players
York City F.C. players
Burton Albion F.C. players
Darlington F.C. players
Whitley Bay F.C. players
Stallion Laguna F.C. players
Kaya F.C. players
Adam Reed
English Football League players
Northern Football League players
Adam Reed
2019 AFC Asian Cup players
Expatriate footballers in the Philippines
English expatriate sportspeople in the Philippines
English people of Filipino descent
Filipino British sportspeople